Knockin' Boots 2001: A Sex Odyssey is the fifth studio album by rapper Candyman. The album was released on February 6, 2001 for X-Ray Records and was produced by Candyman. The album was the fourth straight critical and commercial flop for Candyman and like his previous four albums, did not chart on any album charts or feature any hit singles.

Track listing

2001 albums
Candyman (rapper) albums